John Maeda (born 1966) is a Vice President of Design and Artificial Intelligence at Microsoft.  He is an American technologist and designer whose work explores where business, design, and technology merge to make space for the "humanist technologist."

Previously, Maeda served as is Chief Technology Officer of Everbridge from October 2020 through October 2022. President of Rhode Island School of Design (RISD) from June 2008 until December 2013. Before that he was a research professor at the MIT Media Lab leading advancements in computational design, low-code/no-code, and creative commerce.

Early life and education 
John Maeda was born in 1966 in Seattle, Washington, where his father owned a tofu factory. Maeda studied Computer Science at the Massachusetts Institute of Technology, where he became fascinated with the work of Paul Rand and Muriel Cooper. Cooper was a director of MIT's Visible Language Workshop. After completing his bachelor's and master's degrees at MIT, Maeda completed his PhD in design at Tsukuba University's Institute of Art and Design in Japan. He also has an MBA from Arizona State University.

Career 
As an artist, Maeda’s early work redefined the use of electronic media as a tool for expression by combining computer programming with traditional artistic technique, laying the groundwork for interactive motion graphics on the web. He has exhibited in one-man shows in London, New York and Paris. His work is in the permanent collections of the Museum of Modern Art, the San Francisco Museum of Modern Art and the Cartier Foundation in Paris.

He is formerly Executive Vice President, Chief Experience Officer at Publicis Sapient where he developed the LEAD (Light, Ethical, Accessible, Dataful) doctrine for technology products and services. Prior to that he was Global Head, Computational Design and Inclusion at Automattic where he sought to address the diversity gap in tech by exploring how inclusion could be a key ingredient for success in the technology industry. Before that he was Design Partner at Kleiner Perkins Caufield & Byers (KPCB) where he advised startups on the business impact of design and continues as a Strategic Advisor. He also served on the Board of Directors of consumer electronics company Sonos and global advertising firm Wieden+Kennedy.

He was a professor at the MIT Media Lab for 12 years where he fostered a community of designers who could code and engineers who could design called the Aesthetics + Computation Group, and then created the Physical Language Workshop with Henry Holtzman. Shortly after the launch of the Design By Numbers project to teach artists and designers how to code, he helped to accelerate the Scratch language project in an NSF proposal with outreach across the digital divide. He resigned from MIT in 2008 to become the President of the Rhode Island School of Design (RISD), just as the global financial crisis of 2007-09 took hold.

In 2011, RISD's faculty majority passed a vote of no confidence in Maeda. He survived the vote, and subsequently led RISD to be recognized by the business community as number one in the world while shepherding the national STEAM movement, feeling that "art and design are poised to transform our economy in the 21st century like science and technology did in the last century." For his work in advancing STEAM education, Maeda was recognized with a Tribeca Film Festival Disruptor Award and the Nancy Hanks Lecture on Arts & Public Policy at the John F. Kennedy Center. Maeda resigned from his RISD presidency at the end of 2013 and joined KPCB. Around the same time he also joined eBay's Design Advisory Board as chairman.

In 2014 and 2015, he guest curated and hosted PopTech: REBELLION and PopTech: HYBRID.

In 2015 he published his first Design In Tech Report to connect the investing world with the world of design and technology. A 2nd Design in Tech Report was published in 2016 and later in 2017, a 3rd Design In Tech Report was published.

From 2019 until 2020, he was an Executive Vice President and Chief Experience Officer at Publicis Sapient where he helped businesses bridge strategy and engineering with computational design.

Awards 
In 1999, he was named one of the 21 most important people in the 21st century by Esquire. In 2001, he received the National Design Award for Communication Design in the United States and Japan's Mainichi Design Prize.

In 2009, he was inducted into the New York Art Director’s Club Hall of Fame, and he received the AIGA Medal in 2010. He is a trustee of the Cooper–Hewitt, National Design Museum.

Honorary doctorates awarded by Drexel University (2017), Simon Fraser University (2014), Maryland Institute College of Arts (2003).

Personal life 
Maeda is married to Kris Maeda and together they have five daughters. Kris and John Maeda worked together on the design consultancy, MAEDASTUDIO.

Bibliography 

 
 Redesigning Leadership (Simplicity: Design, Technology, Business, Life), MIT Press, 2011
 The Laws of Simplicity, MIT Press, 2006.
 Creative Code, Thames and Hudson, 2004.
 maeda@media, Thames and Hudson / Rizzoli / Bangert Verlag, 2000.
 Design By Numbers, MIT Press, 1999.
 Tap, Type, Write, Digitalogue Co., 1998.
 12 o’clocks, Digitalogue Co., 1997.
 Flying Letters, Digitalogue Co., 1996.
 Reactive Square, Digitalogue Co., 1995.

See also 
 Software art
 Internet art
 List of presidents of the Rhode Island School of Design

References

External links 

 Kleiner Perkins Caufield & Byers (KPCB) site
 2015 KPCB #DesignInTech Report site
 
 "How art, technology and design inform creative leaders" (TEDGlobal 2012)
 "Designing for simplicity" (TED2007)
 Creative Leadership blog
 The Laws of Simplicity site
 Maedastudio site

1966 births
Living people
American graphic designers
Massachusetts Institute of Technology alumni
National Design Award winners
Artists from Seattle
University of Tsukuba alumni
MIT School of Architecture and Planning alumni
American academics of Japanese descent
Kleiner Perkins people
American people of Japanese descent
American businesspeople
MIT Media Lab people
Presidents of the Rhode Island School of Design
AIGA medalists
Scientific American people